Anna Kiełbasińska (born 26 June 1990) is a Polish sprinter who competed occasionally also in hurdling events. She won the bronze medal in the 400 metres as well as silver medals in the 4 x 100 m and 4 x 400 m relays at the 2022 European Championships. Kiełbasińska earned bronze for the 400 m at the 2023 European Indoor Championships. She won several major medals as part of Polish 4 x 400 m relay teams and also individual medals at European Under-20 and U23 Championships.

Kiełbasińska represented Poland at the Summer Olympics in 2012, 2016 and 2020, and at the World Athletics Championships in 2011, 2015, 2017, 2019 and 2022. She won more than 10 individual Polish national titles.

Career
Anna Kiełbasińska won the gold medal for the women's 4 x 400 metres relay at the 2019 European Indoor Championships in Glasgow, alongside Iga Baumgart-Witan, Małgorzata Hołub-Kowalik and Justyna Święty-Ersetic.

At 2019 World Athletics Championships held in Doha, she won the silver medal for the women's 4 x 400 m relay, running in the heats. The team consisted of Hołub-Kowalik, Patrycja Wyciszkiewicz, Święty-Ersetic and Baumgart-Witan.

Just five months before the postponed 2020 Tokyo Olympics in 2021, she underwent surgery to fix a broken navicular bone in her ankle. The third-grade fracture was fixed with two screws. Despite this, at the Games she helped Poland to victory in the heats of the women’s 4 x 400 m relay, earning the silver medal alongside Baumgart-Witan, Hołub-Kowalik, Święty-Ersetic and Natalia Kaczmarek.

In February 2022, Kiełbasińska set a new Polish indoor record in the 400 metres in a time of 51.10 seconds at a meeting in Ostrava, Czech Republic.

She is based in Poland, but joins Dutch athletes, who are under the guidance of coach Laurent Meuwly, on training camps about four times a year.

Kiełbasińska suffers from alopecia areata, an auto-immune disease.

Statistics

International competitions

1Time from the heats; Kiełbasińska was replaced in the final.

Personal bests
 60 metres indoor – 7.21 (Toruń 2021)
 100 metres – 11.22 (-0.4 m/s) (Chorzów 2022)
 200 metres – 22.76 (+1.9 m/s) (La Chaux-de-Fonds 2021)
 200 metres indoor – 23.02 (Toruń 2023)
 400 metres – 50.28 (Paris 2022)
 400 metres indoor – 51.10 (Ostrava 2022)

National titles
 Polish Athletics Championships
 100 metres: 2014
 200 metres: 2015, 2016, 2017
 4 x 100 m relay: 2016
 4 x 400 m relay: 2013, 2014
 Polish Indoor Athletics Championships
 200 metres: 2011, 2012, 2014, 2015, 2016, 2017, 2018
 400 metres: 2009

References

External links

 

1990 births
Living people
Athletes from Warsaw
Polish female sprinters
Polish female hurdlers
Olympic athletes of Poland
Athletes (track and field) at the 2012 Summer Olympics
Athletes (track and field) at the 2016 Summer Olympics
World Athletics Championships athletes for Poland
World Athletics Championships medalists
European Athletics Indoor Championships winners
Athletes (track and field) at the 2020 Summer Olympics
Medalists at the 2020 Summer Olympics
Olympic silver medalists in athletics (track and field)
Olympic silver medalists for Poland
20th-century Polish women
21st-century Polish women
European Athletics Championships medalists